The 1960 Baltimore Orioles season involved the Orioles finishing second in the American League with a record of 89 wins and 65 losses, eight games behind the AL Champion New York Yankees, it was their first winning season since moving to Baltimore in 1954.

Offseason 
 November 30, 1959: Billy Loes and Billy O'Dell were traded by the Orioles to the San Francisco Giants for Jackie Brandt, Gordon Jones, and Roger McCardell.
 December 2, 1959: Bob Nieman was traded by the Orioles to the St. Louis Cardinals for Gene Green and Charles Staniland (minors).
 December 23, 1959: Chico Carrasquel was released by the Orioles.

Regular season

Season standings

Record vs. opponents

Opening Day starters 
Jackie Brandt
Marv Breeding
Jim Gentile
Ron Hansen
John Powers
Brooks Robinson
Gus Triandos
Jerry Walker
Gene Woodling

Notable transactions 
 April 18, 1960: Joe Ginsberg was signed as a free agent by the Orioles.
 May 12, 1960: John Powers was acquired by the Cleveland Indians off waivers from the Orioles.
 June 9, 1960: Gene Stephens was acquired by the Orioles from the Boston Red Sox in exchange for Willie Tasby.
 June 15, 1960: Joe Ginsberg was released by the Orioles.
 June 30, 1960: Jim Busby was signed as a free agent by the Orioles.
 July 4, 1960: Bobby Thomson was signed by the Orioles as a free agent.
 September 1, 1960: Dave Philley was purchased by the Orioles from the San Francisco Giants.
 September 7, 1960: Del Rice was acquired by the Orioles off waivers from the St. Louis Cardinals.

Roster

Player stats

Batting

Starters by position 
Note: Pos = Position; G = Games played; AB = At bats; H = Hits; Avg. = Batting average; HR = Home runs; RBI = Runs batted in

Other batters 
Note: G = Games played; AB = At bats; H = Hits; Avg. = Batting average; HR = Home runs; RBI = Runs batted in

Pitching

Starting pitchers 
Note: G = Games pitched; IP = Innings pitched; W = Wins; L = Losses; ERA = Earned run average; SO = Strikeouts

Other pitchers 
Note: G = Games pitched; IP = Innings pitched; W = Wins; L = Losses; ERA = Earned run average; SO = Strikeouts

Relief pitchers 
Note: G = Games pitched; W = Wins; L = Losses; SV = Saves; ERA = Earned run average; SO = Strikeouts

Awards and honors 
 Paul Richards, Associated Press AL Manager of the Year

Farm system 

LEAGUE CHAMPIONS: Fox Cities

Notes

References 

1960 Baltimore Orioles team page at Baseball Reference
1960 Baltimore Orioles season at baseball-almanac.com

Baltimore Orioles seasons
Baltimore Orioles season
Baltimore Orioles